Paul Sylvester Morton (born July 30, 1950) is an American Baptist pastor. He is the co-pastor of Changing a Generation Full Gospel Baptist Church in Atlanta, Georgia, and Overseer of Greater St. Stephen Full Gospel Baptist Church in New Orleans, Louisiana. He is also a recording artist, author, and founder of the Full Gospel Baptist Church Fellowship, International.

Early years
Paul Sylvester Morton is the son of the late bishop C.L. Morton Sr. and the late evangelist Matilda E. Morton. His father pastored two congregations, one in Windsor, Ontario, named Mount Zion Church of God in Christ in Canada and one in Detroit, Michigan, named Mount Zion Tabernacle Church of God in Christ; both were a part of the Church of God in Christ, Inc. (COGIC) denomination. Growing up, he showed talent in music. He sang with his brothers Bishop C.L. Morton Jr, Bishop James H. Morton, the lesser known, George Morton and became known all over the country. He was also the founder of a young singing group called the Junior Progressives and served as director of the Youth Choir in his father's church.

Bishop Morton graduated from the J. C. Patterson Collegiate Institute, then attended St. Clair College, where he excelled in music. In 1972 Morton moved to New Orleans, Louisiana and to the Greater St. Stephen Missionary Baptist Church (now known as Greater St. Stephen Full Gospel Baptist Church) under the pastorate of Reverend Percy Simpson, where he became an assistant pastor. Soon after arriving in New Orleans, Morton attended and graduated from Union Baptist College and Theological Seminary.

Greater St. Stephen Missionary Baptist Church (1972–1992)

In December 1974, Pastor Simpson died and the then Assistant Pastor Morton was installed as senior pastor in January 1975. Upon becoming the church's new pastor, Morton began to commit to a mission to "help people reach their ultimate potential spiritually" in their relationships with Jesus Christ by teaching them to operate in "spirit over mind." Under Morton's leadership, both the financial growth and the growth of the congregation would increase dramatically.

In the early days of his pastoral ministry, Morton's sermons began to draw hundreds of listeners. Since becoming Greater St. Stephen MBC's senior pastor, he has incorporated several seasonal institutes and revivals, numerous community outreach programs, and implemented over 60 active-in-house ministries.

In 1997, the ministry purchased an Army Naval Base and renamed it St. Stephen City. This new development provides affordable housing to more than 75 families, also an apartment complex, St. Stephen Manor which provides housing to over 50 families. Also in 1997, the ministry purchased an office building which now houses the new corporate headquarters, home to the ministry's daily operations, and to several other community businesses.

Bishop Morton continues to spread the Word of God through the Changing a Generation daily radio and weekly television broadcasts which air in several markets nationwide, including a nationally televised broadcast from Greater St. Stephen FGBC and Changing a Generation FGBC-Atlanta on Dream Television Network, Black Entertainment Television(BET) and Word Network. Morton has also made appearances on Trinity Broadcasting Network's Praise The Lord segments, and CBN's The 700 Club program.

Bishop Morton's commitment to the community is evident by his participation on the board of One Church-One Addict and the nation's leading gospel magazine, Gospel Today. He is also the president of the Paul S. Morton, Sr. Scholarship Foundation and president of the Paul S. Morton Bible College and School of Ministry.

In 1980, Greater St. Stephen MBC had begun its initial move from their original 600 seat sanctuary facility to a 2000-seat facility adjacent to the original edifice. During this period the church began to grow from 647 members to over 20,000 members presently, expanding to three church locations in the Greater New Orleans area. Collectively Greater St. Stephen FGBC offered eight worship services per week. five services on Sunday, and two Word Explosion services on Wednesday, and a Friday night Deliverance Service.

Full Gospel Baptist Church Fellowship (FGBCF)

In 1992, Bishop Morton helped to co-found the Full Gospel Baptist Church Fellowship, a movement to lead and teach born-again Christians primarily in the Baptist denomination, how to operate in the fullness of the Holy Spirit, while becoming more strongly grounded in their faith in Jesus.

Works connected to Greater St. Stephen Full Gospel Baptist Church (FGBC)

Literary

Why Kingdoms Fall

Outside of the FGBC, Bishop Morton is an author and a musical recording artist. One of his books is entitled Why Kingdoms Fall describes his personal struggle life between mental breakdown and his miraculous spiritual restoration. In addition to Why Kingdoms Fall, Morton has also authored the books ,"What is the Full Gospel Baptist Church?."; and "It's Time for the Outpouring".

Musical

In addition to being a preacher and educator, Bishop Morton is a singer. In 1999, Bishop Morton released his solo CD (album) entitled Crescent City Fire.

Let It Rain & I'm Still Standing

In 2003 Morton recorded the single "Let It Rain", then in 2006, following the Hurricane Katrina disaster, and after surviving a battle with cancer, he recorded the song "I'm Still Standing". Included among his other musical accomplishments are five albums with the Greater St. Stephen Mass Choir and two recordings with the Full Gospel Baptist Church Fellowship Mass Choir. He was also featured on the all-star recording of the hit song, "Something Inside So Strong" a tribute to Rosa Parks.

Tehiliah Music Group

In 2002, Bishop Morton became the CEO of Tehiliah Music Group, with Pastor Jerry Q. Parries, pastor of Christian Family Worship Center in Orlando, Florida, serving as its president. Tehillah Magazine is a lifestyle publication aligned with Tehillah Music Group.

Personal life
Shortly after his appointment as senior pastor of St. Stephen MBC, Morton married the former Debra Brown, in December 1977. Together they have three children: Jasmine, Paul Jr., and Christiann.  Later, his son Paul Jr. became a Grammy Award winning musician, called PJ Morton.

Bishop Morton's Greater St. Stephen's Church purchased the former home of Buddy Bolden, "the First Man of Jazz", took it out of commerce leaving it vacant, sited for demolition by neglect.

References

Bishop Paul Morton bio at CBN website
Bishop Morton's bio at Detroit Gospel.com

External links
Full Gospel Baptist Fellowship website
Bishop Paul Morton's official website

1950 births
20th-century African-American people
21st-century African-American people
African-American Baptist ministers
African-American television personalities
American bishops
American evangelists
Baptist ministers from the United States
Baptist writers
Living people
Writers from Windsor, Ontario